Sara Moro (born ) is a Spanish female artistic gymnast, representing her nation at international competitions.  

She participated at the 2000 Summer Olympics and 2004 Summer Olympics. She also competed at world championships, including the 2001 World Artistic Gymnastics Championships and 2003 World Artistic Gymnastics Championships.

References

External links

1984 births
Living people
Spanish female artistic gymnasts
Place of birth missing (living people)
Gymnasts at the 2004 Summer Olympics
Gymnasts at the 2000 Summer Olympics
Olympic gymnasts of Spain
Real Grupo de Cultura Covadonga sportsmen
Sportspeople from Gijón
Mediterranean Games gold medalists for Spain
Mediterranean Games silver medalists for Spain
Mediterranean Games bronze medalists for Spain
Mediterranean Games medalists in gymnastics
Competitors at the 2001 Mediterranean Games